Houéyogbé  is a town, arrondissement, and commune in the Mono Department of south-western Benin. The commune covers an area of 290 square kilometres and as of 2002 had a population of 74,492 people.

References

Communes of Benin
Arrondissements of Benin
Populated places in the Mono Department